The 1972 North Carolina lieutenant gubernatorial election was held on November 7, 1972. Democratic nominee Jim Hunt defeated Republican nominee John A. Walker with 56.69% of the vote.

Primary elections
Primary elections were held on May 6, 1972.

Democratic primary

Candidates
Jim Hunt, attorney
Roy G. Sowers Jr.
Margaret T. Harper
Allen C. Barbee, former State Representative
Reginald L. Frazier

Results

Republican primary

Candidates
John A. Walker, businessman
Norman H. Joyner, former State Senator

Results

General election

Candidates
Major party candidates
Jim Hunt, Democratic
John A. Walker, Republican

Other candidates
Benjamin G. McLendon, American

Results

References

1972
Gubernatorial
North Carolina